A bridge tender  operates and maintains a bridge to ensure the safe passage of water traffic and vehicle traffic on the bridge. For a railroad bridge, the bridge tender is also responsible for rail traffic safety.
 
Moveable bridges typically have a bridge tender's house, from which a bridge tender can observe traffic and operate the bridge, and may also be the employee's residence.

References

Moveable bridges